Dallas Frasca is an Australian roots rock band from Melbourne led by its namesake front-woman, Dallas Frasca.
The band's 2015 album Love Army peaked at number 29 on the ARIA Charts.

History

Namesake 
Born in Adelaide, South Australia and raised in Wangaratta, Victoria, Dallas Frasca is the lead singer of the eponymous band Dallas Frasca. Frasca is a descendant of opera singer Dame Nellie Melba. Frasca began her singing career at age 18, when she discovered her singing ability at a friend's party.

In 2008, Frasca sang for Australian rock band Midnight Oil in Sydney, in support of Amnesty International. 

In early 2009, Frasca performed as one of seven artists from seven continents of the planet for International Earth Day in Montreal, Canada.

In 2018, Frasca was nominated for Artistic Excellence Award at the 2018 Australian Women in Music Awards.

Band 
In 2006, the band won triple j's "Light Your Fuse" competition.

In 2012 Dallas Frasca came third for their song "All My Love" in the AAA category of the International Songwriting Competition (ISC) which had more than 16,000 entries. The song was also re-recorded by Czech artist  where it became a top ten.

In August 2012, Dallas Frasca helped launch Bob Irwin's wildlife foundation.

In April 2015 the band released their third studio album, Love Army recorded by New York-based producer Andy Baldwin. The album peaked at number 29 on the ARIA Charts, becoming the group's first top 50 album.

On 16 September 2016, the three-piece (no bass) released the EP, Dirt Buzz and launched their own independent record label, Spank Betty Records.

Band members
 Dallas Frasca (vocals and guitar)
 Jeff Curran (guitar)
 Rotating members

Discography

Studio albums

Extended plays

Awards and nominations

Australian Women in Music Awards
The Australian Women in Music Awards is an annual event that celebrates outstanding women in the Australian Music Industry who have made significant and lasting contributions in their chosen field. They commenced in 2018.

|-
| 2018
| Dallas Frasca
| Artistic Excellence Award
|

References

Australian rock music groups
Musical groups from Melbourne
2006 establishments in Australia
Musical groups established in 2006